William Rudolph Henry Merk served as the Chief Commissioner of the North-West Frontier Province of British India from 1909 to 1910.

Biography 
William Merk was born in Shimla in 1852.

Notes 

1852 births
1925 deaths
People from British India